Fort Kamehameha was a United States Army military base that was the site of several coastal artillery batteries to defend Pearl Harbor starting in 1907 in Honolulu, Hawaii.

History
The eastern areas of the fort were in the district called Moanalua. It was royal land won by conquest by Kamehameha I in the 1790s and eventually passed to Bernice Pauahi Bishop (named "Bishop's Point") and then inherited by Samuel Mills Damon in 1884. The western side known as Halawa, was the former beach-front estate of Queen Emma of Hawaii. The sandy dunes had been used as a burial site. It was used for the U.S. Army in 1901, and acquired by the U.S. federal government in 1907 by condemnation from Emma's estate. It was sometimes called "Queen Emma Military Reservation" or "Queen Emma Point".

Secretary of War William Howard Taft under President Theodore Roosevelt headed a group to review coastal defenses, in light of "possessions" such as Hawaii and the Philippines, based on the findings of the Board of Fortifications.
Originally named Fort Upton for  General Emory Upton (1839–1881), on January 28, 1909 after local citizens objected, Archibald Cleghorn suggested the name be changed to honor Kamehameha I, the first king of the unified Hawaiian islands.

First phase
From east to west the sites built in the first phase were:

Battery Selfridge
It was named for Lt. Thomas Selfridge, the first person to die in an airplane crash.

Battery Jackson
It was named for American Civil War General Richard H. Jackson. A massive concrete air raid shelter was built in 1915.

Battery Hawkins
Another bunker built here was known as Hawkins annex, fort building 450, NRHP site 84000948, state site 80-13-1603. Although the smallest of the batteries, it is the easiest to access. It was named for General Hamilton Smith Hawkins (1834–1910).

Battery Hasbrouck
It was fort building 460 and NRHP site 84000925. It was directly east of the entrance to Pearl Harbor, designed to protect its mine field, at coordinates , covering . 
It was named for General Henry Cornelius Hasbrouck (1839–1910) son of William C. Hasbrouck.

Battery Chandler and Barri
At the west end of Fort Kamehameha, coordinates  Battery Chandler had two  guns  named for Lt. Rex Chandler who died in an airplane crash in 1913.  Battery Barri had two 4.7-inch (120 mm) guns, was named for Captain Thomas O. Barri who died in the Civil War in 1863. Construction on these was started in September 1914. Barri was dismantled in 1925 and both no longer exist.

Batteries Adair and Boyd
Each of these had two 6-inch (152 mm) Armstrong guns in casemates located on Ford Island. They were constructed starting in August 1916 and named for Lt Henry R. Adair (died 1916) and Captain Charles T. Boyd (died 1916). A few years later an airfield called Luke Field was built on Ford Island, and the site is now owned by the Navy.

Battery Closson
Within a few years the armaments of the first phase were obsolete. In 1920, two 12-inch (305 mm) M1895 guns on a new style M1917 barbette carriage that could traverse a full 360 degrees were installed and named after Civil War General Henry W. Closson. Anti-aircraft guns were also added to protect from attack from above. In 1942, concrete shielding was added above the guns. A row of officers' houses was built in 1916, and a chapel added in 1940.

Use

During World War II, some of the anti-aircraft guns were used in the attack on Pearl Harbor on December 7, 1941. A Japanese Mitsubishi A6M2 model 21 "Zero" was shot down and crashed near the fort.

Preservation
None of the large caliber guns were ever fired except in practice about once a year. They were salvaged after the war. Some other sites within the fort besides the ones listed above were destroyed.
The area around Selfridge and Jackson batteries are now used for the Hawaii Air National Guard.
The eastern side of the military reservation (where Battery Closson was located) became the Mamala Bay Golf Course. 
The "Artillery District of Honolulu" (state historic site 80-13-1382) was added to the National Register of Historic Places listings in Oahu on June 5, 1984.

Fort DeRussy Military Reservation Battery Randolf (which now houses a museum) was also included in the preservation effort.

In the 1970s the Fort Kamehameha Wastewater Treatment Plant was built on the western end of the fort. On October 1, 1992 its  became part of Hickam Air Force Base. The residents were forced out of the homes by the U.S. Air Force and the historic homes were abandoned in 2008 since they were near the runway of Honolulu International Airport despite belonging on the National Register of Historic Places.

See also
 U.S. Army Coast Artillery Corps
 41st Field Artillery Regiment (United States)
 15th Coast Artillery (United States)

References

Further reading

External links

Buildings and structures in Honolulu
Kamehameha
Territory of Hawaii
Historic American Buildings Survey in Hawaii
Kamehameha
1907 establishments in Hawaii
National Register of Historic Places in Honolulu
Military installations established in 1907